No Long Thing is the debut album by Nigerian recording artist D'banj. It was released by Mo'Hits Records in 2005. The album was produced by Don Jazzy, and supported by the singles "Tongolo", "Socor", and "Mobolowowon".

Singles
The music video for "Tongolo" was directed by DJ Tee. It features a cameo appearance from Don Jazzy. D'banj won the "Best Newcomer" award at the 2006 Channel O Music Video Awards for Tongolo.
The music video for "Socor" was also directed by DJ Tee. It also features a cameo appearance from Don Jazzy.
The music video for "Mobolowowon" was also directed by DJ Tee. D'banj played the harmonica in the video.

Track listing

References

2005 debut albums
D'banj albums
Albums produced by Don Jazzy
Yoruba-language albums